Tropidomantis kawaharai is a species of praying mantis in the family Nanomantidae. It is endemic to the remote Marquesas Islands of French Polynesia in the southern Pacific Ocean. It was described from two specimens collected from the island of Hiva Oa. It is notable for being the first praying mantis species known from the archipelago.

References 

Nanomantidae
Mantodea of Oceania
Insects described in 2018
Fauna of the Marquesas Islands